

Correlation of the Early Cretaceous

See also 
 Lists of fossiliferous stratigraphic units in Europe

References 
 

.
 Spain
.
Fossiliferous stratigraphic units